Bontoc may refer to:

 Bontoc, Mountain Province, Philippines
 Bontoc, Southern Leyte, Philippines
 Bontoc people, an ethnic group from Central Luzon, Philippines
 Bontoc language, spoken by the Bontoc people

Language and nationality disambiguation pages